The 2003–04 North West Counties Football League season was the 22nd in the history of the North West Counties Football League, a football competition in England. Teams were divided into two divisions: Division One and Division Two.

Division One 

Division One featured three new teams:

 Bacup Borough, promoted as champions of Division Two
 Stone Dominoes, promoted as runners-up of Division Two
 Trafford, relegated from the Northern Premier League Division One

League table

Division Two 

Division Two featured four new teams:

 Eccleshall, promoted as champions of the Midland Football League
 Flixton, relegated from Division One
 Formby, joined from the Liverpool County Football Combination
 Winsford United, relegated from Division One

League table

References

 http://www.tonykempster.co.uk/archive03-04/nwc1.htm
 http://www.tonykempster.co.uk/archive03-04/nwc2.htm

External links 
 NWCFL Official Site

North West Counties Football League seasons
8